United Nations Security Council resolution 576, adopted unanimously on 21 November 1985, considered a report by the Secretary-General regarding the United Nations Disengagement Observer Force. The Council noted its efforts to establish a durable and just peace in the Middle East but also expressed its concern over the prevailing state of tension in the area.

The resolution decided to call upon the parties concerned to immediately implement Resolution 338 (1973), it renewed the mandate of the Observer Force for another six months until 31 May 1986 and requested that the Secretary-General submit a report on the situation at the end of that period.

See also
 Arab–Israeli conflict
 Golan Heights
 Israel–Syria relations
 List of United Nations Security Council Resolutions 501 to 600 (1982–1987)

References
Text of the Resolution at undocs.org

External links
 

 0576
 0576
Arab–Israeli peace process
Israel–Syria relations
 0576
1985 in Israel
1985 in Syria
November 1985 events